Romeu Katatu Filemón is an Angolan football manager.

In February 2014, he was announced as the Angola national team manager, a job he retained until the end of December 2015.

References 

Living people
Angolan football managers
Angola national football team managers
C.D. Primeiro de Agosto managers
1965 births